Gilroy Catholic College is a Roman Catholic comprehensive co-educational secondary day school, located in Castle Hill, in the Hills District of Sydney, New South Wales, Australia. The College provides a Catholic and general education for students from Year 7 through to Year 12; administered by the Catholic Education Office of the Diocese of Parramatta.

History
Gilroy Catholic College was founded in 1980 with 12 staff members and 137 students enrolled in Year 7. The college was founded on the back of strong parish and local support for a Catholic co-educational secondary school. The college was built on the land formerly belonging to St Gabriel's School for the Hearing Impaired, thus making use of existing buildings. The school was originally intended for students from Year 7 to Year 10. However, in 1982 it was decided that Gilroy would also include students from Year 11 and Year 12.

The school, with continuing support from the CEO and St Gabriel's School for the Hearing Impaired, hosts a learning support centre for secondary students with hearing impairment.

The school's feeder schools originally consisted of St Michael's (Baulkham Hills), Our Lady Of Lourdes (Baulkham Hills South), St Bernadette's (Castle Hill) and Our Lady of the Rosary (Kellyville).

Norman Gilroy
Gilroy Catholic College was named after Cardinal Sir Norman Thomas Gilroy, the first cardinal born in Australia. As well as adopting his name, the college also made Cardinal Gilroy's personal motto, "Christ is my light", its official motto.

In 2004, Gilroy Catholic College celebrated its Silver Jubilee (25th anniversary) as a school and a community. Each year, the college celebrates its patron with a formal Gilroy Day Mass in the morning, while also including celebration activities during the afternoon. This was changed from 17 March, the anniversary of Cardinal Gilroy's elevation to becoming a bishop, to 4 May, the day on which the school was officially opened.

Faith and religion in the College

Gilroy Catholic College offers a number of opportunities for students to engage in Catholicism and further explore their faith. The school offers multiple liturgies for special religious events and each grade is provided with a reflection day on an annual basis to reflect on their faith over the year.

Gilroy Catholic College offers a robust religious education program that incorporates creative learning with faithful exploration. Gilroy Catholic College has previously worked with multiple organizations to assist with charity events, and the school focuses on a specific value each year.

Government funding
On 9 February 2008, The Sydney Morning Herald revealed that  Greens analysis of government figures showed that, over four years, Gilroy received $12.2 million more in federal government funding than it is entitled to under the socioeconomic status (SES) formula.

School technology
Gilroy Catholic College uses a number of technology mediums. Year 7-9 students work with iPads, and Year 10-12 students work with Apple MacBooks. Gilroy Catholic College changed to a "BYOD" (Bring Your Own Device) policy in 2013. Gilroy Catholic College uses a number of Learning Management Systems including Google Classroom for students from Year 7-12.

Notable alumni
 Dylan Ruiz-Diaz – footballer who plays for Polish side Sportis SFC Łochowo.
 Sean Abbott – Current cricketer who has represented Australia in both One Day International and Twenty20 cricket.
 Kane Cleal – Played 42 games in the National Rugby League from 2004-2008. Throughout his career, Cleal played for the Manly Warringah Sea Eagles, South Sydney Rabbitohs and Canterbury-Bankstown Bulldogs. He is the son of former Australian Kangaroo, Noel Cleal.
 Fiona Crawford (Hanes) – softballer at the 2000 & 2004 Olympic Games.
 Jessica Falkholt – Actress. She was most well known as playing the character 'Hope Morrison' in the TV series Home and Away.
 Joshua Heuston – model and actor
 Trent Oeltjen – baseball player at the 2004 Summer Olympics. Oeltjen also played 3 seasons in the MLB for the Arizona Diamondbacks and the Los Angeles Dodgers.
 Luka Prso - Soccer player for the Newcastle Jets.
 Jonathan Boulet – Rock musician, best known for his works as a solo artist. When he attended Gilroy, he was in a band called 'City Escape Fire', but has since released solo albums with him playing almost all of the instruments (drums, bass, guitar, keyboards, sampler and vocals).
 Kailyn Joseph – athlete at the 2018 Commonwealth Games. She represented Australia in the T38 (classification) Long Jump event, despite being classified as a T37 (classification) athlete.
 Meaghan Dowling (Starr) – athlete at the 2000 Summer Paralympics. She competed in the 100m, 200m and 400m in the T46 (classification).

See also

 List of Catholic schools in New South Wales
 Catholic education in Australia
 Catholic Education, Diocese of Parramatta

References

Further reading
A "Gilroy Pioneer"

External links

Baulkham Hills Shire Council: Japanese sister school visits during Australia-Japan Year of Exchange Discusses sister school links between Gilroy College and a school in Japan.
New South Wales Independent Education Union - Statement of Ross Learning Technology Co-ordinator at Gilroy College discusses technology issues

1980 establishments in Australia
Educational institutions established in 1980
Catholic secondary schools in Sydney
Roman Catholic Diocese of Parramatta
Castle Hill, New South Wales